Thliptoceras is a genus of moths of the family Crambidae. The genus was erected by William Warren in 1890.

Species
Thliptoceras althealis (Walker, 1859)
Thliptoceras amamiale Munroe & Mutuura, 1968
Thliptoceras anthropophilum Bänziger, 1987
Thliptoceras artatalis (Caradja, 1925)
Thliptoceras bicuspidatum Zhang, 2014
Thliptoceras bisulciforme Zhang, 2014
Thliptoceras buettikeri Munroe, 1967
Thliptoceras calvatalis C. Swinhoe, 1890
Thliptoceras caradjai Munroe & Mutuura, 1968
Thliptoceras cascalis (C. Swinhoe, 1890)
Thliptoceras decoloralis (Warren, 1896)
Thliptoceras distictalis Hampson, 1899
Thliptoceras epicrocalis C. Swinhoe, 1890
Thliptoceras fenestratum Aurivillius, 1910
Thliptoceras filamentosum Zhang, 2014
Thliptoceras fimbriata (C. Swinhoe, 1900)
Thliptoceras formosanum Munroe & Mutuura, 1968
Thliptoceras fulvale de Joannis, 1932
Thliptoceras fulvimargo (Warren, 1895)
Thliptoceras fuscociliale (Snellen, 1895)
Thliptoceras gladialis (Leech, 1889)
Thliptoceras impube Zhang, 2014
Thliptoceras lacriphagum Bänziger, 1987
Thliptoceras neotropicalis Schaus, 1912
Thliptoceras polygrammodes Hampson, 1899
Thliptoceras semicirculare Zhang, 2014
Thliptoceras shafferi Bänziger, 1987
Thliptoceras sinensis (Caradja, 1925)
Thliptoceras stygiale Hampson, 1896
Thliptoceras umoremsugente Bänziger, 1987

Former species
Thliptoceras elegans Guillermet, 1996

References

Pyraustinae
Crambidae genera
Taxa named by William Warren (entomologist)